Ely Ernesto Lopes Fernandes (born 4 November 1990), commonly known as Ely, is a Cape Verdean professional footballer who plays for as a forward for Liga I club Universitatea Cluj.

Career
Ely made his professional debut in the Segunda Liga for UD Oliveirense on 14 September 2013, in a 3–2 win against Tondela.

Honours
UD Vilafranquense
Portuguese District Championships – Lisbon FA Pró-National Division: 2015–16

References

External links
 
 
 

1987 births
Living people
Cape Verdean footballers
Cape Verde international footballers
Association football forwards
Liga Portugal 2 players
Liga I players
Liga II players
C.D. Fátima players
Gil Vicente F.C. players
U.D. Oliveirense players
C.D. Santa Clara players
C.D. Pinhalnovense players
CS Gaz Metan Mediaș players
FC Viitorul Constanța players
FCV Farul Constanța players
FC Universitatea Cluj players
Cape Verdean expatriate footballers
Cape Verdean expatriate sportspeople in Portugal
Expatriate footballers in Portugal
Cape Verdean expatriate sportspeople in Romania
Expatriate footballers in Romania